

UEFA Champions League
Champions League 2005–06: On 26 July 2005, Anorthosis Famagusta achieved one of the greatest results in Cypriot football history when they beat the Turkish team Trabzonspor 3–1 in the first leg of their UEFA Champions League second qualifying round match. They lost the second leg 1–0 in Turkey, but progressed 3–2 on aggregate. In the third-round qualifying tie against the Scottish team Rangers, Anorthosis lost the first leg 2–1, and the second leg 2–0, so dropped into the first round of the UEFA Cup. They were then defeated 6–1 on aggregate by the Italian team Palermo.

Champions League 2008–09: After winning the domestic league 2007–2008 Anorthosis managed to qualify for the 2008–2009 UEFA Champions League group stage, over-running Armenian champions FC Pyunik, Austrian champions Rapid Wien and Greek champions Olympiacos in the qualifying rounds. This allowed the team to qualify for the Group Stage of the Champions League, the first time for a Cypriot team. In the group stage, they earned their first point following a 0–0 away draw with Werder Bremen, then got their first win beating Panathinaikos FC 3–1 while Hawar Mulla Mohammed became the first Iraqi player to score in the UEFA Champions League, although they lost to Inter Milan 1–0 at San Siro, they drew 3–3 in GSP Stadium. In their 5th Champions League game, Anorthosis had a chance to make it to the knock-out stage if they would have won against Werder Bremen. Anorthosis went up 2–0, but in the second half Diego made the score 2–1, and minutes before the match ended, Hugo Almeida managed to equalise for Bremen, and the match finished 2–2. Anorthosis still had a chance to get into the knock-out stage in the final match against Panathinaikos if they would have won. However, during the last game they lost 1–0 away to Panathinaikos. Inter (who had already qualified for the next stage) lost 2–1 to Bremen, meaning that Anorthosis finished fourth – missing out on a consolation UEFA Cup place. In the week prior to the game against Panathinaikos the club was disrupted when the Directors complained to the police that the President was embezzling funds. He was remanded in custody and forced to resign, eventually being released by the police without charges.

UEFA Cup
UEFA Cup 1991–92: The return in European salons after 8 years of absence. Anorthosis was invited to address the 1986 European champion, the famous Steaua Bucharest. The beginning was hard work; the hardest after losing 2–1 in the first game held in a crowded Antonis Papadopoulos Stadium. In the second match Anorthosis would succeed the impossible but finally luck played a bad game. After stunning appearance and excellent coaching from Iortaneskou tied the score with his first goal of the game Obiku and Ketsbaia led the game in overtime, where the Romanians being far more experienced competitors in front of the audience equaled getting this ticket of qualifying. The overexertion of Anorthosis players were actually moving, which realized the anorthosiatikos world and the next day swept Larnaca airport deifying their "fallen hero" of Bucharest.

UEFA Cup 1992–93: In 1992–93 the team participated again in the UEFA Cup. Dreams dashed any discrimination on hearing the draw that brought us face to face with the Other "Old Lady" the famous Juventus. With giants from the world of world football like Roberto Baggio, Gianluca Vialli, Fabrizio Ravanelli, Pierluigi Casiraghi, Angelo Peruzzi, Moreno Torricelli, Andreas Moller, Julio Cesar, Jurgen Kohler and under the guidance of Trapattoni subsequent holder of the trophy summarily whacked Anorthosis defeating them 6–1 in Turin and 0–4 at the Antonis Papadopoulos. The titular goal of Anorthosis noted Temuri Ketsbaia and coach had the Georgian Koutsaef.

UEFA Cup 1994–95: After one year of absence and returned again to the UEFA Cup. Fateful meant to be this year as Anorthosis made its first European qualification for the Bulgarian FC Shumen. In the first game held at the Antonis Papadopoulos Stadium the team under the guidance of Andrew Mouskalli won 2–0 with goals of Charalambous and Nikolic took clear precedence for the qualification and despite the fact that we were in a very early iterative trailing by 1–0 with goals from Ashiotis Gkogkits and Anorthosis took second victory over the Bulgarians together and qualification. In the next round the team had to face the pride of the Basque Athletic Bilbao, in the first game held at the Antonis Papadopoulos Stadium the team scored a historic victory by defeating the Spaniards 2–0, the goals of the team are experienced Siniša Gogić and Pune. In iterative held in furnace under the name San Mames the team tried but honestly was clearly influenced by the absence of the great star of Gkogkits and abortion of Andreas Panayiotou and Vassos Tsangari, so they lost 3–0 and was eliminated from the Then with the last goal to be noted shortly before maturity. The pride we felt as Greeks Famagustans listening Basques shouting rhythmically Famagusta name as a mark of respect and solidarity was something indescribable.

UEFA Cup 2007–08: Anorthosis qualified for the 2007–08 UEFA Cup by way of their Cypriot Cup win. They entered the competition at the First Qualifying round stage. Aggregate victories over FK Vardar and CFR 1907 Cluj saw them move through to the First Round proper. Anorthosis were drawn against English Premier League side Tottenham Hotspur. The first leg was played at White Hart Lane on 20 September 2007 which Tottenham Hotspur won 6–1. On 4 October 2007 the second leg resulted in a 1–1 draw when Robbie Keane equalised for Tottenham Hotspur after Fabinho had put Anorthosis ahead.

UEFA Europa League
Europa League 2009–10: After the highs of their exploits in the previous season's Champions League, Anorthosis went crashing out of the 2009–10 UEFA Europa League in the second qualifying round, losing 4–3 on aggregate to OFK Petrovac of Montenegro.

Europa League 2010–11: Anorthosis started well the Europa League 2010–11 by beating FC Banants of Armenia 3–0 and 0–1 respectively. However, in the second round they lost 0–2 to HNK Šibenik of Croatia. Furthermore, for the next round they managed to qualify after a 3–0 victory accompanied by great performance.
In the third qualifying round Anorthosis had a poor performance against Cercle Brugge, losing 0–1 in Belgium. Whenever they came back in Cyprus for the rematch they defeated Cercle 3–1 with Cafu scoring all 3 goals. Anorthosis's adventure ended with a 0–4 loss in Moscow and a 1–2 home loss against CSKA Moscow.

Europa League 2011–2012: Anorthosis in season 2011–12 started from the Second qualifying round. On that round Anorthosis met Fc Garga Georgia. The Cypriot club defeated the Georgian Club 3–0 at the Antonis Papadopoulos Stadium, but then lost to the Georgian Club 2–0 in Zestafoni. In the third qualifying round Anorthosis encountered FK Rabotnički Skopje. The first match at Antonis Papadopoulos Stadium was not the ideal for the Cypriot club, after the first 70 minutes the result was still 0–0. The Skopje Club scored in their first real opportunity in the game, after another 10 minutes the Skopje club scored a second goal after an incredible mistake by the Anorthosis' goalkeeper Dimitar Ivankov. In the second match at the Philip II Arena Anorthosis won 1–2 FK Rabotnički. The score 0–2 until 87-minute, which would send the game to extra-time. After that match Dimitar Ivankov was released from his contract and removed from the Anorthosis Squad.

Europa League 2012–2013: Anorthosis began the season in Second qualifying round of Europa League. Anorthosis faced the cup winner of Estonian for the season 2011–12, Levadia Tallinn, On the first match Anorthosis Famagusta defeat the Estonian club 3–1 (Spadacio, Toni Calvo, Ricardo Laborde) in Kadrioru Stadium, with MVP the best player of the club Ricardo Laborde. On 26 July in Antonis Papadopoulos Stadium Anorthosis defeat Levadia Tallinn with score 3–0 with scorers (Okkas, Toni Calvo, Ricardo Laborde), with MVP the attacking midfielder of the team Juliano Spadacio. On 28 August, Anorthosis defeat Georgian Dila Gori away with score 0–1, With scorer Giannis Okkas at 69th minute. Dila Gori played with 10 players after the ban of Gogita Gogua with red card from the referee. On 9 August after a bad match anorthosis end there European dream at 3rd QR. of uefa europa league. Anorthosis lost 3–0 at his home from Dila Gori.

European competition matches

1963–64 European Cup

1964–65 Cup Winners' Cup

1971–72 Cup Winners' Cup

1975–76 Cup Winners' Cup

1983–84 UEFA Cup

1991–92 UEFA Cup

1992–93 UEFA Cup

1994–95 UEFA Cup

1995–96 Champions League

1996–97 UEFA Cup

1997–98 Champions League – Uefa CUP

1998–99

1999–00

2000–01

2002–03

2003–04

2004–05

2005–06

2007–08

2008–09 Champions League

2009–10

2010–11

2011–12 Europa League

2012–13 Europa League

Record
{| class="wikitable"
|-
! Season
! Competition
! Round
! Club
! Home
! Away
!
|-
| 1963–64
| European Cup
| style="text-align:center;"|Q
|  Partizan
|1–3
|0–3
| style="text-align:center;"|
|-
|  style="text-align:center; background:white;"|
|-
| 1964–65
| Cup Winners' Cup
| style="text-align:center;"|Q
|  Sparta Prague
|0–61
|0–10
| style="text-align:center;"|
|-
|  style="text-align:center; background:white;"|
|-
| 1971–72
| Cup Winners' Cup
| style="text-align:center;"|1R
|  Beerschot
|0–12
|0–7
| style="text-align:center;"|
|-
|  style="text-align:center; background:white;"|
|-
| 1975–76
| Cup Winners' Cup
| style="text-align:center;"|1R
|  Ararat Yerevan
|1–1
|0–9
| style="text-align:center;"|
|-
|  style="text-align:center; background:white;"|
|-
| 1983–84
| UEFA Cup
| style="text-align:center;"|1R
|  Bayern Munich
|0–1
|0–10
| style="text-align:center;"|
|-
|  style="text-align:center; background:white;"|
|-
| 1991–92
| UEFA Cup
| style="text-align:center;"|1R
|  Steaua București
|1–2
|2–2
| style="text-align:center;"|
|-
|  style="text-align:center; background:white;"|
|-
| 1992–93
| UEFA Cup
| style="text-align:center;"|1R
|  Juventus
|0–4
|1–6
| style="text-align:center;"|
|-
|  style="text-align:center; background:white;"|
|-
| rowspan=2|1994–95
| rowspan=2|UEFA Cup
|  style="background:#cfc; text-align:center;"|Q
| style="background:#cfc;"|  Shumen
| style="background:#cfc;"|2–0
| style="background:#cfc;"|2–1
|  style="background:#cfc; text-align:center;"|
|-
| style="text-align:center;"|1R
|  Athletic Bilbao
|2–0
|0–3
| style="text-align:center;"|
|-
|  style="text-align:center; background:white;"|
|-
| 1995–96
| Champions League
| style="text-align:center;"|Q
|  Rangers
|0–0
|0–1
| style="text-align:center;"|
|-
|  style="text-align:center; background:white;"|
|-
| rowspan=2|1996–97
| rowspan=2|UEFA Cup
|  style="background:#cfc; text-align:center;"|1Q
| style="background:#cfc;"|  Shirak
| style="background:#cfc;"|4–0
| style="background:#cfc;"|2–2
|  style="background:#cfc; text-align:center;"|
|-
| style="text-align:center;"|2Q
|  Neuchâtel Xamax
|1–2
|0–4
| style="text-align:center;"|
|-
|  style="text-align:center; background:white;"|
|-
| rowspan=3|1997–98
| rowspan=2|Champions League
|  style="background:#cfc; text-align:center;"|1Q
| style="background:#cfc;"|  Kareda Kaunas
| style="background:#cfc;"|3–0
| style="background:#cfc;"|1–1
|  style="background:#cfc; text-align:center;"|
|-
| style="text-align:center;"|2Q
|  Lierse
|2–0
|0–3
| style="text-align:center;"|
|-
| UEFA Cup
| style="text-align:center;"|1R
|  Karlsruher SC
|1–1
|1–2
| style="text-align:center;"|
|-
|  style="text-align:center; background:white;"|
|-
| rowspan=3|1998–99
| rowspan=2|Champions League
|  style="background:#cfc; text-align:center;"|1Q
| style="background:#cfc;"|  Valletta
| style="background:#cfc;"|6–0
| style="background:#cfc;"|2–0
|  style="background:#cfc; text-align:center;"|
|-
| style="text-align:center;"|2Q
|  Olympiacos
|2–4
|1–2
| style="text-align:center;"|
|-
| UEFA Cup
| style="text-align:center;"|1R
|  Zürich
|2–3
|0–4
| style="text-align:center;"|
|-
|  style="text-align:center; background:white;"|
|-
| rowspan=3|1999–00
| rowspan=2|Champions League
|  style="background:#cfc; text-align:center;"|1Q
| style="background:#cfc;"|  Slovan Bratislava
| style="background:#cfc;"|2–1
| style="background:#cfc;"|1–1
|  style="background:#cfc; text-align:center;"|
|-
| style="text-align:center;"|2Q
|  Hertha
|0–0
|0–2
| style="text-align:center;"|
|-
| UEFA Cup
| style="text-align:center;"|1R
|  Legia Warszawa
|1–0
|0–2
| style="text-align:center;"|
|-
|  style="text-align:center; background:white;"|
|-
| 2000–01
| Champions League
| style="text-align:center;"|Q
|  Anderlecht
|0–0
|2–4
| style="text-align:center;"|
|-
|  style="text-align:center; background:white;"|
|-
| rowspan=3|2002–03
| rowspan=3|UEFA Cup
|  style="background:#cfc; text-align:center;"|Q
| style="background:#cfc;"|  Grevenmacher
| style="background:#cfc;"|3–0
| style="background:#cfc;"|0–2
|  style="background:#cfc; text-align:center;"|
|-
|  style="background:#cfc; text-align:center;"|1R
| style="background:#cfc;"|  Iraklis
| style="background:#cfc;"|3–1
| style="background:#cfc;"|2–4
|  style="background:#cfc; text-align:center;"|
|-
| style="text-align:center;"|2R
|  Boavista
|0–1
|1–2
| style="text-align:center;"|
|-
|  style="text-align:center; background:white;"|
|-
| 2003–04
| UEFA Cup
| style="text-align:center;"|Q
|  Željezničar Sarajevo
|1–3
|0–1
| style="text-align:center;"|
|-
|  style="text-align:center; background:white;"|
|-
| rowspan=4|2005–06
| rowspan=3|Champions League
|  style="background:#cfc; text-align:center;"|1Q
| style="background:#cfc;"|  Dinamo Minsk
| style="background:#cfc;"|1–0
| style="background:#cfc;"|1–1
|  style="background:#cfc; text-align:center;"|
|-
|  style="background:#cfc; text-align:center;"|2Q
| style="background:#cfc;"|  Trabzonspor
| style="background:#cfc;"|3–1
| style="background:#cfc;"|0–1
|  style="background:#cfc; text-align:center;"|
|-
| style="text-align:center;"|3Q
|  Rangers
|1–2
|0–2
| style="text-align:center;"|
|-
| UEFA Cup
| style="text-align:center;"|1R
|  Palermo
|0–4
|1–2
| style="text-align:center;"|
|-
|  style="text-align:center; background:white;"|
|-
| rowspan=3|2007–08
| rowspan=3|UEFA Cup
|  style="background:#cfc; text-align:center;"|1Q
| style="background:#cfc;"|  Vardar
| style="background:#cfc;"|1–0
| style="background:#cfc;"|1–0
|  style="background:#cfc; text-align:center;"|
|-
|  style="background:#cfc; text-align:center;"|2Q
| style="background:#cfc;"|  Cluj
| style="background:#cfc;"|0–0
| style="background:#cfc;"|3–1
|  style="background:#cfc; text-align:center;"|
|-
| style="text-align:center;"|1R
|  Tottenham Hotspur
|1–1
|1–6
| style="text-align:center;"|
|-
|  style="text-align:center; background:white;"|
|-
| rowspan=6|2008–09
| rowspan=6|Champions League
|  style="background:#cfc; text-align:center;"|1Q
| style="background:#cfc;"|  Pyunik
| style="background:#cfc;"|1–0
| style="background:#cfc;"|2–0
|  style="background:#cfc; text-align:center;"|
|-
|  style="background:#cfc; text-align:center;"|2Q
| style="background:#cfc;"|  Rapid Wien
| style="background:#cfc;"|3–0
| style="background:#cfc;"|1–3
|  style="background:#cfc; text-align:center;"|
|-
|  style="background:#cfc; text-align:center;"|3Q
| style="background:#cfc;"|  Olympiacos
| style="background:#cfc;"|3–0
| style="background:#cfc;"|0–1
|  style="background:#cfc; text-align:center;"|
|-
| rowspan="3" style="text-align:center;"|G
|  Werder Bremen
|2–2
|0–0
| rowspan="3" colspan="2" style="text-align:center;"| 4th place  
|-
|  Panathinaikos
|3–1
|0–1
|-
|  Internazionale
|3–3
|0–1
|-
|  style="text-align:center; background:white;"|
|-
| rowspan=2|2009–10
| rowspan=2|Europa League
|  style="background:#cfc; text-align:center;"|1Q
| style="background:#cfc;"| Käerjéng 97
| style="background:#cfc;"|5–0
| style="background:#cfc;"|2–1
|  style="background:#cfc; text-align:center;"|
|-
| style="text-align:center;"|2Q
|  Petrovac
|2–1
|1–3 (a.e.t.)
| style="text-align:center;"|
|-
|  style="text-align:center; background:white;"|
|-
| rowspan=4|2010–11
| rowspan=4|Europa League
|  style="background:#cfc; text-align:center;"|1Q
| style="background:#cfc;"| Banants
| style="background:#cfc;"|3–0
| style="background:#cfc;"|1–0
|  style="background:#cfc; text-align:center;"|
|-
|  style="background:#cfc; text-align:center;"|2Q
| style="background:#cfc;"| HNK Šibenik
| style="background:#cfc;"|0–2
| style="background:#cfc;"|3–0 (a.e.t.)|  style="background:#cfc; text-align:center;"|
|-
|  style="background:#cfc; text-align:center;"|3Q
| style="background:#cfc;"| Cercle Brugge
| style="background:#cfc;"|3–1| style="background:#cfc;"|0–1
|  style="background:#cfc; text-align:center;"|
|-
| style="text-align:center;"|4Q
|  CSKA Moscow
|1–2
|0–4
| style="text-align:center;"|
|-
|  style="text-align:center; background:white;"|
|-
| rowspan=2|2011–12
| rowspan=2|Europa League
|  style="background:#cfc; text-align:center;"|2Q
| style="background:#cfc;"| FC Gagra
| style="background:#cfc;"|3–0| style="background:#cfc;"|0–2
|  style="background:#cfc; text-align:center;"|
|-
| style="text-align:center;"|3Q
|  FK Rabotnički
|0–2
|2–1| style="text-align:center;"|
|-
|  style="text-align:center; background:white;"|
|-
| rowspan=2|2013–14
| rowspan=2|Europa League
|  style="background:#cfc; text-align:center;"|2Q
| style="background:#cfc;"| Levadia Tallinn
| style="background:#cfc;"|3–0| style="background:#cfc;"|3–1|  style="background:#cfc; text-align:center;"|
|-
| style="text-align:center;"|3Q
|   FC Dila Gori
|0–3
|1–0| style="text-align:center;"|
|-
|  style="text-align:center; background:white;"|
|-
| 2018–19
| Europa League
| style="text-align:center;"|1Q
|  Laçi
|2–1|0–1
| style="text-align:center;"|
|-
|  style="text-align:center; background:white;"|
|-
| 2020–21
| Europa League
| style="text-align:center;"|3Q
|  Basel
| 
|2–3
| style="text-align:center;"|
|-
|  style="text-align:center; background:white;"|
|-
| rowspan=5|2021–22
| Europa League
| style="text-align:center;"|3Q
|  Rapid Wien
|2–1|0–3
| style="text-align:center;"|
|-
| rowspan=4|Europa Conference League
| style="text-align:center;"|PO
|  Hapoel Be'er Sheva
|3–1|0–0
| style="text-align:center;"|
|-
| rowspan="3" style="text-align:center;"|B
|  Gent
|1-0'|0-2
| rowspan="3" colspan="2" style="text-align:center;"| 3rd place  
|-
|  Partizan
|0-2
|1–1
|-
|  Flora
|2-2
|2-2
|}

1: Both matches played in Czechoslovakia. 
2: Both matches played in Belgium.

UEFA club competition recordLast Update: 9 December 2021''

By country

References

Bibliography

External links 
 Uefa Official website

Association football clubs established in 1911
Anorthosis Famagusta F.C.
Cypriot football clubs in international competitions